United Nations Security Council Resolution 2069 was unanimously adopted at its 6843rd meeting, on 9 October 2012.

See also 
List of United Nations Security Council Resolutions 2001 to 2100

References

2012 United Nations Security Council resolutions
United Nations Security Council resolutions concerning Afghanistan
2012 in Afghanistan
October 2012 events